The Wheel of Time is an American high fantasy television series developed by Rafe Judkins for Amazon Prime Video. The series is based on the novel series of the same name by Robert Jordan with Brandon Sanderson.

The first season, consisting of eight episodes, premiered on Prime Video on November 19, 2021, with the first three episodes released immediately and the remaining five on a weekly basis after that, culminating in the season finale on December 24, 2021. The series was renewed for a second season in May 2021, before the series premiered. In July 2022, ahead of the second-season premiere, the series was renewed for a third season.

Premise
The Wheel of Time follows Moiraine, a member of the Aes Sedai, a powerful organization of women who can channel the One Power. With her Warder, Lan, she seeks a group of five young villagers from the secluded Two Rivers region of Andor following an attack on their village, believing one of them is the reincarnation of the Dragon, an extremely powerful channeller who broke the world. The Dragon Reborn is prophesied to either save the world from a primordial evil known as the Dark One, or break it once more.

Cast and characters

Main
 Rosamund Pike as Moiraine Damodred, an Aes Sedai of the Blue Ajah who is searching for the Dragon Reborn
 Daniel Henney as al'Lan Mandragoran, Moiraine's Warder and companion
 Zoë Robins as Nynaeve al'Meara, Wisdom of Emond's Field
 Madeleine Madden as Egwene al'Vere, a villager and daughter of the mayor of Emond's Field in the Two Rivers suspected of being the Dragon Reborn
 Josha Stradowski as Rand al'Thor, a villager and shepard from Emond's Field suspected of being the Dragon Reborn
 Marcus Rutherford as Perrin Aybara, a villager and blacksmith from Emond's Field suspected of being the Dragon Reborn
 Barney Harris (season 1) and Dónal Finn (season 2) as Mat Cauthon, a villager and gambler from Emond's Field suspected of being the Dragon Reborn
 Kate Fleetwood as Liandrin Guirale, an Aes Sedai of the Red Ajah
 Priyanka Bose as Alanna Mosvani, an Aes Sedai of the Green Ajah
 Hammed Animashaun as Loial, an Ogier who meets Rand in Tar Valon
 Sophie Okonedo as Siuan Sanche, the Amyrlin Seat, head of the Aes Sedai
 Kae Alexander as Min Farshaw a tavern keeper in Fal Dara who can see the Pattern
 Fares Fares as Ba'alzamon, also known as Ishamael, "the Betrayer of Hope"

Supporting

 Lolita Chakrabarti as Marin al'Vere
 Michael Tuahine as Bran al'Vere
 Michael McElhatton as Tam al'Thor
 Johann Myers as Padan Fain, a traveling merchant
 Naana Agyei Ampadu as Danya, Two Rivers resident
 Mandi Symonds as Daise Congar
 David Sterne as Cenn Buie
 Juliet Howland as Natti Cauthon
 Christopher Sciueref as Abell Cauthon
 Petr Simcák as Tom Thane
 Litiana Biutanaseva as Bode Cauthon
 Lilibet Bituanaseva as Eldrin Cauthon
 Abdul Salis as Eamon Valda, a Whitecloak Questioner
 Stuart Graham as Geofram Bornhald, a Whitecloak captain
 Pearce Quigley as Master Hightower, a ferryman
 Alexandre Willaume as Thom Merrilin, a gleeman
 Álvaro Morte as Logain Ablar, a male channeler claiming to be the Dragon Reborn
 Clare Perkins as Kerene Nagashi, an Aes Sedai
 Izuka Hoyle as Dana, a barmaid
 Peter Franzén as Stepin, a Warder
Daryl McCormack as Aram, a Tinker
 Narinder Samra as Raen, a Tinker
 Maria Doyle Kennedy as Illa, a Tinker
 Taylor Napier as Maksim, Alanna's Warder
 Emmanuel Imani as Ihvon, Alanna's Warder
 Miguel Álvarez as King of Ghealdan
 Ceara Coveney as Elayne Trakand, a princess and heir to the kingdom of Andor
 Guys Roberts as Uno Nomesta, a warrior of Shienar
 Arnas Fedaravicius as Masema Dagar, a warrior of Shienar
 Gregg Chillingirian as Ingtar Shinowa, a warrior of Shienar
 Amar Chadha-Patel as Lord Yakota
 Thomas Chaanhing as Lord Agelmar, ruler of Fal Dara
 Sanra Yi Sencindiver as Lady Amalisa

Episodes

Production

Background
In 2000, NBC optioned the screen rights to Robert Jordan's fantasy novel series The Wheel of Time but did not ultimately proceed with the production. In 2004, Jordan sold the film, television, video game, and comic rights to the series to production company Red Eagle Entertainment. In 2015, Red Eagle Entertainment paid air time to cable network FXX to air Winter Dragon, a 22-minute pilot for a potential The Wheel of Time series starring Billy Zane and Max Ryan that allowed Red Eagle to hold on to the rights to the project. Subsequently, the company sued Jordan's widow, Harriet McDougal, for her comments about the pilot; the lawsuit was settled in 2016. In April 2016, McDougal announced that a major studio was undergoing contract negotiations for production on a TV series.

Development
A new adaptation of the series was announced on April 20, 2017, produced by Sony Pictures Television in association with Red Eagle Entertainment and Radar Pictures. Rafe Judkins was expected to serve as showrunner for the series and executive produce alongside Rick Selvage, Larry Mondragon, Ted Field, Mike Weber, Lauren Selig and Darren Lemke. McDougal was set to serve as a consulting producer. By October 2018, the series had been in development for a year, and Amazon Studios had agreed to produce it. In January 2019, Judkins announced that two additional writers, Michael and Paul Clarkson, had joined the production's writing team. By April 2019, Kelly Valentine Hendry had been attached as casting director.

In June 2019, it was announced that Rosamund Pike, who portrays Moiraine Damodred, would also serve as a producer. Brandon Sanderson, who had completed the book series following Robert Jordan's death, was also confirmed to be serving as consulting producer along with McDougal. On various occasions, Sanderson wrote about his contributions to the production, which he described as "reading the scripts and offering feedback directly to Rafe, the showrunner". Judkins has said that Maria Simons, a long-time editorial assistant to Robert Jordan and McDougal, also provides feedback on scripts. The lead characters from Emond's Field were written as older than their book counterparts. The production team thought that television shows with seventeen-year-old lead characters could feel like young adult fiction, which was not a genre they felt was suitable for the series. 

Uta Briesewitz was confirmed as the director of the first two episodes in February 2019. Salli Richardon-Whitfield was confirmed to be directing episodes five and six in November 2019, and Wayne Yip was confirmed to be directing episodes three and four in December. The director of episodes seven and eight, Ciaran Donnelly, was revealed in February 2020. 

On May 20, 2021, Amazon renewed the series for a second season ahead of the series premiere. The first episode of the second season is titled "A Taste of Solitude", with the teleplay by Amanda Kate Shuman. Thomas Napper, Maja Vrvilo, and Sanaa Hamri have been reported to be directing episodes of season 2, with Hamri directing half of the season and serving as an executive producer. On July 21, 2022, ahead of the second-season premiere, Amazon renewed the series for a third season.

Casting
Rosamund Pike was cast as the lead Moiraine in June 2019. Further main cast members were announced in August 2019: Daniel Henney as Lan Mandragoran, Josha Stradowski as Rand al'Thor, Marcus Rutherford as Perrin Aybara, Zoë Robins as Nynaeve al'Meara, Barney Harris as Mat Cauthon, and Madeleine Madden as Egwene al'Vere. Michael McElhatton was announced to be playing Tam al'Thor in early November 2019. Irish actor Daryl McCormack was said to have been cast in an undisclosed role in mid-November 2019, later revealed to be the role of Aram. Several more main cast members were announced in December 2019: Alexandre Willaume as Thom Merrilin, Johann Myers as Padan Fain, Hammed Animashaun as Loial, Alvaro Morte as Logain Ablar, Priyanka Bose as Alanna Mosvani, Taylor Napier as Maksim, and Emmanuel Imani as Ivhon .

In January 2020, Kate Fleetwood posted on her Instagram page that she had been cast to play the role of Liandrin Guirale. In March 2020, Jen Cheon Garcia announced that she had been cast as Leane Sharif. In June 2020, eight additional roles were announced: Lolita Chakrabarti as Marin Al'Vere, Michael Tuahine as Bran Al'Vere, David Sterne as Cenn Buie, Christopher Sciueref as Abell Cauthon, Juliet Howland as Natti Cauthon, Mandi Symonds as Daise Conger, Abdul Salis as Eamon Valda, and Stuart Graham as Geofram Bornhald. In July 2020, Darren Clarke was revealed to be playing the role of Basel Gill. That same month, Maria Doyle Kennedy and Narinder Samra were cast as Illa and Raen, respectively. Sophie Okonedo as Siuan Sanche, Kae Alexander as Min Farshaw, Peter Franzen as Stepin, and Clare Perkins as Kerene Nagashi were all announced in August 2020.

In September 2021, it was announced that Harris would not be returning for the second season and that Dónal Finn would be playing the role of Mat going forward. In October 2021, Ceara Coveney, Natasha O'Keeffe and Meera Syal joined the cast as series regulars for the second season, with Coveney confirmed to be playing the role of Elayne Trakand. In December 2021, three recurring cast members were announced: Guys Roberts as Uno Nomesta, Arnas Fedaravicius as Masema Dagar, and Gregg Chillingirian as Ingtar Shinowa. The role of Ingtar was originally to be played by Amar Chadha-Patel, but due to scheduling conflicts his role was changed to "Lord Yakota". Thomas Chaanhing was confirmed for the role of Lord Agelmar and Sanra Yi Sencindiver was confirmed for the role of Lady Amalisa. In April 2022, it was announced that Ayoola Smart would play the role of Aviendha.

Filming

Season 1 
Table reads with the cast had begun by early October 2019. Principal photography for the first season started on September 16, 2019. Filming in Prague was halted in March 2020 due to the COVID-19 pandemic but had resumed by April 2021 and concluded in May 2021. Jordan Studios in Prague, constructed for the production, served as the primary production base. Other filming locations included parts of the Czech Republic; Dubrovnik, Croatia; Segovia, Spain; Slovenia; and the Canary Islands. Judkins has said that shooting in the Canary Islands was intended to be more extensive, but "because of COVID-19 we were not able to do that. It had been scouted, so we sent our drone and visual effects teams to build where we were going to go into a 3D digital world that we could then put our actors into.". In a behind-the-scenes video, Season 1 finale director Ciaran Donnelly said that scenes taking place in The Blight were supposed to be shot on Gomera, but COVID restrictions prevented traveling there. He credited production designer Ondrej Nekvasil with designing an artificial forest that could be built in Jordan Studios as a replacement.

Filming in the Czech Republic qualified the production for the Czech Film Fund's incentive program, making available CZK 352million (US $16.3million) in incentives. Executive producer Marigo Kehoe said that "For us shooting here in the Czech Republic was the only choice". Filming in Slovenia similarly qualified the production for tax incentives of $314 thousand. Prague's Z Molu Es Kennel provided wolfdogs for the production between October 2019 and February 2020.

Season 2 
Filming for the second season began on July 19, 2021, and filming in Prague was scheduled to conclude by February 2022. Jindřichův Hradec, Calanchi Di Aliano, Ginosa, Letohrádek Hvězda, Barrandov Studios, CLA Studios in Ouarzazate, Masseria Lo Spagnulo, Masseria Borzone, and Chateau Karlova Koruna were reported as filming locations, along with Jordan Studios in Prague. More than 500 of the production crew's 600 members are reported to be residents of the Czech Republic.

Music 
Showrunner Rafe Judkins said that for the soundtrack he "did not want to be what the cliché is, i.e., typical, what one would expect of that genre". Composer Lorne Balfe instead referred to "a big hot pot of different styles" such as Balinese, Celtic, Southern, and Cajun, feeling that it was important to give the soundtrack more modern touches and "not to make it just traditional 'medieval folk music'". In incorporating the fictional language "Old Tongue" into the soundtrack, Balfe worked with a dialect and language coach to ensure lyrics were grammatically correct and had them written out phonetically for singers. He said that "when watching the show the vocals are the narrative of the scene…They're to do with actually supporting the storyline of the scene and the character's development."

The first of four albums for season one, titled "The First Turn", was released on November 12, 2021, by Milan Records in digital, CD, and vinyl formats. The album contained fourteen tracks that were largely conceptual but contained key themes that spawned variations in the final score. Balfe said that "The score to this series is a re-imagination of fantasy music, doing away with the genre's reliance on large, traditional orchestras in favor of more modern colors while retaining the strong melodies and bold harmonies that fans can expect from such an epic."

Season 1 

A second album, "The Wheel of Time: Season 1, Volume 1", was released on November 19, 2021, featuring music that was largely used in season one's first three episodes.

"The Wheel of Time: Season 1, Volume 2", was released on December 3, 2021.

The final album, "The Wheel of Time: Season 1, Volume 3", was released on December 17, 2021.

Season 2 
On January 12, 2022, Balfe confirmed that he would be returning to score Season 2.

Visual effects 
In early 2020, Julian Perry was attached to the series as Overall Visual Effects Supervisor. Special effects company Cinesite was revealed to be working on the visual effects of the series in April 2020. Additional VFX work was done by MPC Episodic, Outpost VFX, Automatik VFX, Union VFX, RISE, DNEG, Framestore, Scanline, Zelda VFX and Ombrium VFX. In an interview, Perry discussed how the challenging nature of the show and a more limited post-production period resulting from the 2020 production halt required them to work with a large number of VFX studios to "help spread workload".

Release
The series premiered on the streaming service Amazon Prime Video on November 19, 2021, with the first three episodes available immediately and the rest debuting on a weekly basis. The first two episodes premiered in theaters in London, UK, and select cities across the US on November 15, 2021, ahead of the streaming release of the first three episodes. The series was the most-watched Prime Video premiere of 2021 and among the most-watched Prime Video premieres on record; the premiere was also the most-pirated television program of the week. The series had "the greatest average audience demand in the US in the first 30 days after its premiere of any new series" in 2021. According to Nielsen, season one accumulated 4.91 billion viewing minutes, making it the second-most watched season of a Prime Video original series on Nielsen's records.

The first volume in the book series, The Eye of the World, saw a spike in sales that has been attributed to the series release. For the week of November 28, 2021, it was the second-most sold book across all formats on Amazon.com. It also made the January 2022 The New York Times Best Seller list in the mass market fiction category list and was number one on the audio fiction list.

Reception

Critical reception 
The review aggregator website Rotten Tomatoes reports an 82% approval rating and an average rating of 7.05/10, based on 93 reviews. The critics' consensus reads, "The Wheel of Times revolutions can be a bit creaky as it tries to stand out from other fantasy series, but it succeeds admirably in making Robert Jordan's epic approachable for the uninitiated." Metacritic, which uses a weighted average, assigned a score of 55 out of 100 based on 24 critics, indicating "mixed or average reviews". 

Ed Power of The Daily Telegraph gave the series 4 out of 5, writing: "In its early episodes this big Wheel has enough sweep, mystique and momentum to suggest that it can keep on turning and give Amazon the global hit it dearly craves." Keith Phipps of TV Guide gave the series 4 out of 5, writing: "Most importantly, it works as a piece of storytelling, creating an elaborate fictional universe but also reasons for viewers to care about that universe's fate and intrigue about what happens next." Lucy Mangan of The Guardian gave the series 3 out of 5, writing: "It's absolutely fine. It's got brio, it's got style and it's got enough portentous voiceover book-ending events to make everything feel high stakes." John Doyle of The Globe and Mail wrote that the series had "a certain charm in its depiction of ordinary people living in this beautiful but fraught place", but criticized it for what he described as "an overreliance on special effects and spectacle, to the point where you'd rather get back to the people involved." Preeti Chibber of Polygon stated, "The Wheel of Time is a very strong start to a much-awaited series and created by someone who has a clear understanding of how adaptations can soar when complementing their source material rather than just copying it." Mini Anthikad Chhibber of The Hindu described watching the first two episodes of the series as "a fun experience", and praised the visuals and action.

Alan Sepinwall of Rolling Stone gave the series 2 out of 5, praising the show's visuals and writing that it "may bring in some fantasy fans starved for any morsel of magic and wonder", but added: "the whole thing is empty, if expensive, calories." Fiona Sturges of the Financial Times gave the series 2 out of 5, writing: "While there is enough violence and faux-mysticism to keep genre fans happy, convincing human interactions are harder to find." Chancellor Agard, writing for Entertainment Weekly, noted a lack of character development despite the series' overall watchability. Variety criticized the series for speeding through too much story. Brian Lowry of CNN described the series as "Amazon's poor-man's version of The Lord of the Rings", and wrote: "the characters simply don't possess enough pop to draw in those who don't come immersed in the mythology, and the special effects are uneven."

Accolades

Spin-offs

Wheel of Time: Origins 
Six animated "Origins" shorts were released alongside the release of season 1 which provide additional context about the show's fictional world. These three-minute videos are titled "The Breaking of the World", "The Fall of Manetheren", "The Greatest Warder", "Saidar, Saidin, Stone", "The White Tower", and "An Ogier's Longing". These shorts were written by Rammy Park and directed by Dan DiFelice with Judkins, Craig Muller, and Mike Weber serving as executive producers. Rupert Degas, Ida May, Steven Hartley, and Evelyn Miller served as narrators.

In writing the episodes, Park wanted each to be focused on concepts that tied in thematically with the main show, might be of interest to series newcomers, and that long-time readers of the books might like to see visually. After Muller and Weber approved each script, Judkins gave the final approval, ensuring that an episode did not spoil information the writers intend the main show to convey later on. Director Dan DiFelice said that he wanted to take full advantage of the animated medium and not "just take live action and paint over it", and that he wanted to capture a "certain grittiness, mood, and texture" in the art style and direction. His team consisted of a "huge team from MPC but then all these freelancers, globally..."

During a panel at San Diego Comic-Con 2022, it was announced that more episodes of Origins would be released starting in August 2022. The first of these would be focused on the character of Lan Mandragoran.

Notes

References

External links
 

Epic television series
American fantasy drama television series
2020s American drama television series
2021 American television series debuts
English-language television shows
Amazon Prime Video original programming
American action adventure television series
Serial drama television series
Television shows based on American novels
Television series by Sony Pictures Television
Television series by Amazon Studios
High fantasy television series
The Wheel of Time
Television productions suspended due to the COVID-19 pandemic
Television shows filmed in the Czech Republic